The Bhanga–Kuakata line is a planned railway line Bangladesh to connect Bhanga with Beach City Kuakata in Patuakhali. It is planned to build by 2030. It also connects Barisal Division to the rest of Bangladesh.

History 
The Padma Bridge Rail Link Project brings South and South Western regions of Bangladesh under the railway network. In the first phase, an initiative was taken to construct a broad gauge railway spanning 172 km from Dhaka's Kamalapur to Jessore in the southwestern district.

On October 9, 2016, permission was given to build a railway from Faridpur's Bhanga Junction railway station to Port of Payra. Later, the project was extended from Payra to Kuakata. Construction was to start in 2022 with completion in 2030.

The feasibility study proposal along with detailed design was approved by the Planning Minister on 9 October 2016. A consulting contract was signed on June 19, 2018. Project implementation progress is 40 percent

References 

Dual gauge railways in Bangladesh
Padma Bridge
Proposed railway lines in Asia